Living Proof is an album by American singer Sylvester, released in 1979 on the Fantasy label. Living Proof was a double-record set featuring three sides of live material recorded at War Memorial Opera House in San Francisco, California. The fourth side of the album included three new studio recordings.

Commercial performance
The album peaked at No. 45 on the R&B albums chart. It also reached No. 123 on the Billboard 200. The album features the singles "Can't Stop Dancing", which peaked at No. 43 on the Hot Soul Singles chart, and a cover version of Patti LaBelle's "You Are My Friend", which charted at No. 30 on the Hot Soul Singles chart. "Can't Stop Dancing", along with the track "In My Fantasy (I Want You, I Need You)", both reached No. 2 on the Hot Dance Club Play chart.

Track listing

Personnel
Sylvester - lead vocals
Patrick Cowley - synthesizers and secuencer
James "Tip" Wirrick - electric guitar
Eric Robinson, Michael Finden - electric piano, organ and clavinet
Bob Kingson - bass
Kelvin Dixon - drums
David Frazier, Richard Kvistad, Gus Anthony Flores - percussions
Jay Stolmac, Marc Baum - saxophone and flute
Dan Reagan - trombone
Ross Wilson - trombone and trumpet
Dean Boysen - trumpet
Randall Pratt - harp

Charts
Album

Singles

External links

References 

1979 live albums
Sylvester (singer) albums
Albums produced by Harvey Fuqua
Fantasy Records live albums